Émile-Georges Drigny (3 July 1883 – 9 July 1957) was a French sports official and water polo player, who competed at the 1920 Summer Olympics. He started his career as a sports administrator around 1911, when he became head of the swimming section of the Union des Sociétés Françaises de Sports Athlétiques. He was responsible for the swimming events at the 1924 Summer Olympics, where he also worked as a journalist for L'Intransigeant. In 1926 he co-founded the Ligue Européenne de Natation and was its president in 1938–1948. He was also a member of the International Olympic Committee and president of FINA in 1928–1932 and of the Fédération Française de Natation in 1942–1949. In 1984, he was inducted into the International Swimming Hall of Fame.

References

External links 

 

Presidents of FINA
International Olympic Committee members
French male water polo players
Olympic water polo players of France
1883 births
1957 deaths
Sportspeople from Melun
Water polo players at the 1920 Summer Olympics
20th-century French people
21st-century French people
Presidents of the French Swimming Federation